The 91st Brigade was a formation of  the British Army. It was raised as part of the new army also known as Kitchener's Army and assigned to the 30th Division, but was transferred to the 7th Division in December 1915. It served on the Western Front during the First World War.

Order of battle
The brigade formed in 30th Division in April 1915 and moved to 7th Division in December of that year, swapping with the 21st Brigade.

The initial composition of the brigade was:
20th (Service) Battalion, Manchester Regiment (5th City)
21st (Service) Battalion, Manchester Regiment (6th City)
22nd (Service) Battalion, Manchester Regiment (7th City)
24th (Service) Battalion, Manchester Regiment (Oldham)

The brigade was disbanded after the war but was reactivated in 1950 as the 91st Lorried Infantry Brigade, until 1956 when it was redesignated the 12th Infantry Brigade.

The following officers commanded the brigade during its relatively brief existence:
Brigadier Frederick Stephens: December 1950-May 1952
Brigadier David Russell Morgan: May 1952-March 1953
Brigadier Graham Peddie: March 1953-March 1956

References

Infantry brigades of the British Army in World War I
Pals Brigades of the British Army
Infantry brigades of the British Army